Platylepis is a genus of flowering plants from the orchid family, Orchidaceae. It is widespread across sub-Saharan Africa and also on various islands of the Pacific and Indian Oceans.

Platylepis bigibbosa H.Perrier - Madagascar
Platylepis bombus J.J.Sm. - Seram
Platylepis commelynae (Lindl.) Rchb.f. - Society Islands
Platylepis constricta (J.J.Sm.) J.J.Sm. - New Guinea
Platylepis densiflora Rolfe - Réunion
Platylepis geluana (Schltr.) Schuit. & de Vogel - New Guinea
Platylepis glandulosa (Lindl.) Rchb.f. - widespread across tropical and southern Africa
Platylepis grandiflora (Schltr.) Ormerod - New Caledonia, Vanuatu, Futuna
Platylepis heteromorpha Rchb.f. - Samoa
Platylepis intricata Schuit. & de Vogel - Papua New Guinea
Platylepis lamellata Schltr. - New Guinea
Platylepis margaritifera Schltr.  - Madagascar
Platylepis occulta (Thouars) Rchb.f. - Madagascar, Réunion, Mauritius, Seychelles
Platylepis polyadenia Rchb.f.  - Madagascar, Comoros
Platylepis rufa (Frapp.) Schltr. - Réunion
Platylepis tidorensis J.J.Sm. - Maluku
Platylepis viscosa (Rchb.f.) Schltr. - Réunion
Platylepis xerostele Ormerod - Cameroon
Platylepis zeuxinoides Schltr. - New Guinea

See also 
 List of Orchidaceae genera

References 

 Pridgeon, A.M., Cribb, P.J., Chase, M.A. & Rasmussen, F. eds. (1999). Genera Orchidacearum 1. Oxford Univ. Press.
 Pridgeon, A.M., Cribb, P.J., Chase, M.A. & Rasmussen, F. eds. (2001). Genera Orchidacearum 2. Oxford Univ. Press.
 Pridgeon, A.M., Cribb, P.J., Chase, M.A. & Rasmussen, F. eds. (2003). Genera Orchidacearum 3. Oxford Univ. Press
 Berg Pana, H. 2005. Handbuch der Orchideen-Namen. Dictionary of Orchid Names. Dizionario dei nomi delle orchidee. Ulmer, Stuttgart

External links 

Cranichideae genera
Goodyerinae